Major Arthur William Lupton (23 February 1879 – 14 April 1944) was an English soldier and amateur first-class cricketer, who played 104 matches for Yorkshire County Cricket Club from 1908 to 1927.  He also played for the Marylebone Cricket Club (MCC) (1909), the Gentlemen of England (1910) and H.D.G. Leveson-Gower's XI (1911).

Military career
Lupton was commissioned a second lieutenant in The Prince of Wales's Own (West Yorkshire Regiment) on 5 May 1900. He served with the 2nd battalion of his regiment in South Africa during the Second Boer War 1899-1900, and took part in operations in Natal March–June 1900, and in Transvaal, east and west of Pretoria, July–November 1900.  Following the war he received the Queen's South Africa Medal with three clasps, and he was promoted to Lieutenant on 10 January 1902.

Cricket career
Born in Little Horton, Bradford, Yorkshire, England, Lupton had a modest overall record, despite the large number of games that he played. A left-handed batsman, he scored 724 runs at 10.34 with a highest score of 43 not out against Nottinghamshire in 1926. He took 14 wickets (none of them for Yorkshire) at 32.50 with his occasional right-arm fast-medium, with a best analysis for 4 for 109 for Gentlemen of England against Cambridge University in 1910.

His chief contribution was as Yorkshire's captain. Having playing only one game for the county, back in 1908, he was appointed captain for the 1925 season at the age of 46. Yorkshire won the County Championship that year with 21 wins and no losses. He then led the side to second place in 1926 and third in 1927. He wanted to continue in 1928, but the Yorkshire committee, after at first deciding to appoint a professional captain, changed their minds and chose the amateur William Worsley.

Lupton died in April 1944 at Carlton Manor, Guiseley, Yorkshire.

References

External links
Cricinfo profile
Cricket Archive statistics

1879 births
1944 deaths
Yorkshire cricketers
Yorkshire cricket captains
People from Little Horton
English cricketers
Marylebone Cricket Club cricketers
Gentlemen of England cricketers
Sportspeople from Yorkshire
West Yorkshire Regiment officers
H. D. G. Leveson Gower's XI cricketers
British Army personnel of the Second Boer War